Toni-Seelos-Olympiaschanze is a ski jumping hill in Seefeld outside of Innsbruck, Austria. It is a part of the Seefeld Nordic Competence Centre consists of two hills, a normal hill with a hill size of HS109 (K-99) and medium hill with at HS75 (K-68). Next to the jumps is a cross-country skiing stadium. It opened in 1931 as Jahnschanze, but was renamed in honor of Anton Seelos in 1948.

The venue was used for the normal hill competitions during the 1964 and 1976 Winter Olympics, and for the FIS Nordic World Ski Championships in 1985 and 2019. It is also regularly used for FIS Nordic Combined World Cup.

References

Ski jumping venues in Austria
Olympic Nordic combined venues
Olympic ski jumping venues
Olympic biathlon venues
Venues of the 2012 Winter Youth Olympics
Sports venues in Tyrol (state)
1930 establishments in Austria
Innsbruck-Land District
Sports venues completed in 1930
Venues of the 1964 Winter Olympics
Venues of the 1972 Winter Olympics